Stone & Wood Brewing Co. is an Australian brewery which is based in Byron Bay, New South Wales. It was awarded 'Champion Large Australian Brewery' at the 2016 Australian International Beer Awards and its Pacific Ale won a silver medal at the World Beer Cup in the English-Style Summer Ale category.

History
The Stone & Wood Brewing Co. was established in 2008 by Jamie Cook, Brad Rogers and Ross Jurisich, all of whom previously worked at Carlton & United Breweries. They constructed their first 25-hectolitre brewery in Byron Bay.

In 2012 Cook, Rogers and Jurisich bought back the 20 per cent share of its business held by Lion (a wholly owned subsidiary of Kirin), following that company's takeover of Little World Beverages.

In 2014 the company opened a second 50-hectolitre brewery in Murwillumbah. The company won the 'Regional Award' at the 2014 Telstra NSW Business Awards.

In 2021 Stone & Wood parent Fermentum reached an agreement for a 100% sale to Kirin subsidiary Lion (Australia) handing custodianship of the Fermentum family of brands to Lion, subject to regulatory approvals. The Fermentum brands include Stone & Wood Brewing, Two Birds Brewing and Fixation Brewing Company.

Beers
Year-round beers 

Seasonal beers

See also

 List of breweries in Australia

References

Bibliography

External links
 

Australian beer brands
Australian companies established in 2008
Food and drink companies established in 2008
Beer brewing companies based in New South Wales
Byron Bay, New South Wales
Certified B Corporations in the Food & Beverage Industry
B Lab-certified corporations in Australia